Micropholis compta is a species of plant in the family Sapotaceae. The plant is endemic to the Atlantic Forest ecoregion in southeastern Brazil. It is an IUCN Red List Vulnerable species.

References

compta
Endemic flora of Brazil
Flora of the Atlantic Forest
Trees of Brazil
Vulnerable flora of South America
Taxonomy articles created by Polbot